Campeche Bank is part of the Gulf of Mexico and extends from the Yucatan Straits in the east to the Tabasco-Campeche Basin in the west.

References

External links 
 
 
 
 

Landforms of the Gulf of Mexico
Natural history of Campeche
Islands of Campeche
Undersea banks of the Atlantic Ocean